Ernest Neal (1858–1943), was the 2nd Poet Laureate of Georgia. He was born in Sparta, Georgia (U.S.) in  1858. He lived in Dahlonega for some time, but Calhoun, GA was his home.

Biography 
Neal became Georgia's 2nd Poet Laureate on August 20, 1927. He held the position until his death on January 7, 1943.

One of Neal's best known poems,"The Indian's Heart," was recited at the dedication of the New Echota Monument near Calhoun.

New Echota was the last standing capital of the Cherokee Indians before they were relocated to Oklahoma (i.e. "The Trail of Tears")from 1838–1839; President Andrew Jackson had much to do with this.

Neal wrote many poems about Calhoun  and New Echota.

Poems 

"The Land of the Cherokee" 
Ernest Neal, 
Poet Laureate of Georgia, 
Calhoun, Georgia

Poem read at dedication of the New Echota Monument, 1931

Bibliography 

A second book of verse. Macon: J.W. Burke, 1928.

Yonah, and other poems. Atlanta: Unknown Publisher, 1920.

References 

1858 births
1943 deaths
People from Calhoun, Georgia
Poets from Georgia (U.S. state)
American male poets
Poets Laureate of Georgia (U.S. state)